Erythranthe gracilipes is an uncommon species of monkeyflower known by the common name slenderstalk monkeyflower. It was formerly known as Mimulus gracilipes.

Distribution
It is endemic to California, where it is known only from a section of the central Sierra Nevada foothills.

Description
This annual herb has a scattered distribution, sometimes only growing after a habitat disturbance such as wildfire. This petite wildflower grows no taller than about 8 centimeters. The fuzzy stem has a few pairs of oppositely arranged reddish-green oval leaves each up to about a centimeter long.

The tubular throat of the flower is encapsulated in a hairy red calyx of sepals. The pink flower is no more than a centimeter long and wide. The upper lip has two notched lobes and the wider lower lip has three.

References

External links
Jepson Manual Treatment - Mimulus gracilipes
USDA Plants Profile: Mimulus gracilipes
Mimulus gracilipes - Photo gallery

gracilipes
Endemic flora of California
Flora of the Sierra Nevada (United States)
Natural history of the California chaparral and woodlands
Flora without expected TNC conservation status